Jones Township is the southwesternmost township in Beltrami County, Minnesota, United States. The population was 277 as of the 2000 census. Jones Township was named for an early settler.

Geography

Jones Township is located in the southwestern corner of Beltrami County. The Mississippi River flows through the township, feeding Lake Manomin, more commonly known as Rice Lake.

Lakes
 Lake Manomin
 Moose Lake

Rivers
 Mississippi River
 Little Mississippi River (Piniddiwin)

Adjacent townships
 Lammers Township (north)
 Eckles Township (northeast)
 Grant Valley Township (east)
 Rockwood Township, Hubbard County (southeast)
 Fern Township, Hubbard County (south)
 Bear Creek Township, Clearwater County (southwest)
 Moose Creek Township, Clearwater County (west)
 Shevlin Township, Clearwater County (northwest)

Cemeteries
The township contains Jones Township Cemetery.

Demographics
As of the census of 2000, there were 277 people, 99 households, and 77 families residing in the township.  The population density was 7.8 people per square mile (3.0/km2).  There were 112 housing units at an average density of 3.2/sq mi (1.2/km2).  The racial makeup of the township was 95.67% White, 1.44% Native American, and 2.89% from two or more races.

There were 99 households, out of which 39.4% had children under the age of 18 living with them, 66.7% were married couples living together, 7.1% had a female householder with no husband present, and 22.2% were non-families. 20.2% of all households were made up of individuals, and 9.1% had someone living alone who was 65 years of age or older.  The average household size was 2.80 and the average family size was 3.14.

In the township the population was spread out, with 31.0% under the age of 18, 7.2% from 18 to 24, 28.9% from 25 to 44, 22.4% from 45 to 64, and 10.5% who were 65 years of age or older.  The median age was 35 years. For every 100 females, there were 111.5 males.  For every 100 females age 18 and over, there were 112.2 males.

The median income for a household in the township was $38,750, and the median income for a family was $50,000. Males had a median income of $29,000 versus $20,625 for females. The per capita income for the township was $13,612.  About 5.9% of families and 7.3% of the population were below the poverty line, including 2.1% of those under the age of eighteen and 24.0% of those 65 or over.

References
 United States National Atlas
 United States Census Bureau 2007 TIGER/Line Shapefiles
 United States Board on Geographic Names (GNIS)

Townships in Beltrami County, Minnesota
Townships in Minnesota